The 1974–75 Illinois Fighting Illini men's basketball team represented the University of Illinois.

Regular season

Illinois finished ninth in the Big Ten going went 8-18 overall. Gene Bartow took over the team as head coach. Brought to Illinois to continue the magical rebuilding jobs he had undertaken at Valparaiso and Memphis State, Gene Bartow was counted on by Athletic Director Cecil Coleman to restore the successful level of play fans had become accustomed to in the past few decades. However, Bartow’s stay in Champaign was short-lived, lasting only one year. The lure away from Illinois was a strong one for Bartow; he was hired away by UCLA to replace legendary Bruin coach John Wooden.

This marked the first time that a Big Ten school would finish with a record of 30 or more wins.

Roster

Source

Schedule
																																																
Source																																																																																																
																																																
|-																																																
!colspan=12 style="background:#DF4E38; color:white;"| Non-Conference regular season
	
	
	
	
	
	

|-
!colspan=9 style="background:#DF4E38; color:#FFFFFF;"|Big Ten regular season
	
	
	
	

		
	
		
	
	
	
	
	

	
	
	
|-

Player stats

Awards and honors
Rick Schmidt
Converse Honorable Mention All-American
Team Most Valuable Player

Team players drafted into the NBA

Rankings

References

Illinois Fighting Illini
Illinois Fighting Illini men's basketball seasons
1974 in sports in Illinois
1975 in sports in Illinois